The 1975 World Table Tennis Championships – Swaythling Cup (men's team) was the 33rd edition of the men's team championship.  

China won the gold medal defeating Yugoslavia 5–3 in the final. Sweden won the bronze medal.

Medalists

Swaythling Cup tables

Group A

Group B

Semifinals

Third-place playoff

Final

See also
List of World Table Tennis Championships medalists

References

-